The Kolej Vokasional Shah Alam (formerly known as Sekolah Menengah Teknik Shah Alam and Sekolah Menengah Vokasional Shah Alam) is a public vocational college that specialises in engineering and vocational training. It is located in Shah Alam, Selangor, Malaysia.

Motto
"Teknologi Teras Kejayaan" which means "Technology is The Core of Achievement".

Courses 
 Mechanical Engineering
 Workshop Machine Skills
 Welding and Metal Fabrication
 Computer Programming

See also 
 List of schools in Selangor

References 

Vocational colleges in Malaysia
Universities and colleges in Selangor
1992 establishments in Malaysia
Educational institutions established in 1992
Technical universities and colleges in Malaysia
Engineering universities and colleges in Malaysia
Schools in Selangor